Salem Black River Presbyterian Church (Brick Church) is a historic church in Sumter, South Carolina.

History
This house of worship, commonly called Brick Church, was founded by Scotch-Irish settlers in 1759 on land given by Capt. David Anderson.  Original log meeting house was replaced by frame building and named Salem Presbyterian Church in 1768.  The first Brick Church was built in 1802 and used until 1846 when the present church was built of brick made on the grounds.  The Old Session house (1846) in the rear contains a large library given by James McBride Dabbs in 1862.  Land for the cemetery, dating from 1794 was deeded by Robert Witherspoon in 1830.  Among the notable ministers to serve this church was Dr. Thomas Reese, scholar, teacher and preacher before the American Revolution.  In 1867 African-American members withdrew to form Goodwill Presbyterian Church

The Salem Black River Presbyterian Church was added to the National Register in 1978.

Vandalism
Satanic symbols and messages were spray-painted on the church's exterior on September 29, 2017. The front door to the church also had been kicked in, but the interior was undamaged. Personnel at Shaw Air Force Base provided the Sumter County Sheriff's Office with names of possible suspects, resulting in four arrests.

References

Presbyterian churches in South Carolina
Churches on the National Register of Historic Places in South Carolina
Churches completed in 1846
19th-century Presbyterian church buildings in the United States
Churches in Sumter County, South Carolina
Scotch-Irish American culture in South Carolina
National Register of Historic Places in Sumter County, South Carolina
1759 establishments in South Carolina